Ganesh Harish Hegde is an Indian singer, performer, video director and Bollywood choreographer.

Early life
Ganesh Hegde is a Tuluva Bunt, born on 10 November 1973 in Bombay (present-day Mumbai) to Tulu-speaking parents Harishchandra Subbaiah Hegde and Vidya Hegde. Hegde is known for his work in the Oscar-nominated film Lagaan and for his musical numbers in Company.  Ganesh has choreographed stage shows, namely Temptations 2004, the Bollywood rock concert which toured America with stars such as Shah Rukh Khan, Rani Mukherjee, Preity Zinta, Saif Ali Khan and Arjun Rampal.

He has been associated with the Zee Cine Awards since conception and has been choreographing the Filmfare Awards for the past decade.
from Dum,  "Main Hoon Don" from Don - The Chase Begins Again and Chammak Challo from Ra.One.

Hegde is responsible for the item number and item gal concept in Bollywood with songs like:
Mehboob Mere (Fiza) – Sushmita Sen
Babuji Zara Dheere Chalo (Dum) – Yana Gupta
Khallas (Company) – Isha Koppikar

Hegde started a trend for the music video type execution in movies with Kambakht Ishq (Pyar Tune Kya Kiya) and Khallas (Company)

He was selected as one of the celebrity guests that attended the Miss World Canada 2012 final round event at Vancouver on 13 May 2012.

Singing
In October 2005 Ganesh released his debut album "G" with the backing and promotion of Bollywood star Shah Rukh Khan. He is reported as the first Indian pop act to produce, write, direct and star in his debut music video (for his single Main Deewana). He is also credited for launching the career of Indian model and actress Yana Gupta, for whom he crafted the song "Babuji" in the film Dum.

Hegde started out performing with Asha Bhonsle on stage shows and she is reported to have convinced him to release his own album.  She has sung a duet with him in G, titled Kabhi Kabhi. Hegde then launched his second Pop album Let's party in August 2011 which features Hrithik Roshan and Katrina Kaif in the title song Let's Party and Bipasha Basu and Priyanka Chopra in Mind Blowing. The album was launched by Shahrukh Khan, Hrithik Roshan, Bipasha Basu, Priyanka Chopra and Sonu Nigam. Deepika Padukone has also featured in one of his songs called Bolydude Ganeshan.

Hegde has also sung the rap Kaun Banega Crorepati promo song ' Ek Sawaal Ka Sawaal Hai ', for the third season of the show hosted by Shah Rukh Khan. The song is available on a T Series album titled ' Shah Rukh Khan Kar Le Kar Le Koi Dhamaal'. The video was conceptualised and directed by Hegde.

Education

Hegde is an alumnus of the Umedbhai Patel English School and Prahladrai Dalmia Lions College, Malad, Mumbai.

Filmography

TV
 Jhalak Dikhhla Jaa – Season 9 Judge (2016)
 Jhalak Dikhhla Jaa – Season 8 Judge (2015)
 Boogie Woogie Kids Championship  - Special Appearance (2014)
 Kabhi Kabhii Pyaar Kabhi Kabhii Yaar – Judge (2008)
 Roobaroo Indian Idol season 3 – Special appearance (2007)
 Fame X – Judge (2006)
 Temptations 2004 – Interviewer

Choreographer
Ganesh has done choreography for the following films.

Music Director
 Ram Gopal Varma Ki Aag (2007)

Personal life
Hegde married his girlfriend of six years, Sunayna Shetty, on 5 June 2011 in a private ceremony in Mumbai. They have two sons, Giaan and Hriyaan.

Sunayna is a stylist by profession and is responsible for styling Ganesh for all his public appearances.

The couple had known each other for ten years and started dating six years ago.

Informing his fans on a social networking site the choreographer wrote, "I am getting married next week and that's the reason why have not been in action here with you guys..it's on 5 June and it's in Mumbai..hope I get all the love and best wishes as this one seems to be tough choreography..he he..love g."

References

External links

 

1973 births
Living people
Indian male singers
Indian film choreographers
Mangaloreans
Indian choreographers